Fer is a name. Notable people with the name include:

 Cairbre Nia Fer, legendary Irish king
 Fer (comics): Spanish comic writer (1949-2020)
 Fer Corb, legendary High King of Ireland
 Ferdiad, also Fer Diad, a legendary Irish warrior
 Fer dá Chrích mac Suibni (c. 710-768), Roman Catholic Archbishop of Armagh, Ireland
 Claudio Rodriguez Fer (born 1956), Galician writer
 Émilie Fer (born 1983), French slalom canoer and 2012 Olympic gold medalist
 Leroy Fer (born 1990), Dutch footballer
 Nicolas de Fer (1646–1720), French cartographer and geographer, engraver and publisher